This page lists Japan-related articles with romanized titles beginning with the letter P. Names of people are listed by surname (i.e., "Tarō Yamada" should be listed under "Y", not "T") and initial particles (e.g. "a", "an", "the") are ignored (i.e., "A City with No People" is listed under "City").

Pa
Pac-Man
Pachinko
Pacific League
Pacific Ocean
Pacific Overtures
Pacific Theater of Operations
Pacific War
Pan (Dragon Ball)
Panasonic
Panasonic Q
Panty fetishism
Paper Mario
Para Para
Paradigm City
Paradise Kiss
PaRappa the Rapper
Parasite singles
Pauline (Nintendo)

Pc
PC Engine

Pe
PE'Z
Peace Preservation Law
The Peanuts
Pentax
Pente
Perfect Blue
Personal Digital Cellular
A Personal Matter

Ph
Phantasy Star Online
Philippine Airlines Flight 434

Pi
Piccolo (Dragon Ball)
Pikachu
The Pillow Book
The Pillows
Pilotwings
Pistol Opera
Pizzicato Five

Pl
Planetes
PlayStation
PlayStation 2
PlayStation 3
PlayStation Portable
Plaza Accord

Po
Pokémon
Pokémon Box
Pokémon Card Game
Pokémon Colosseum
Pokémon FireRed
Pokémon LeafGreen
Pokémon League
Pokémon Pikachu
Pokémon Ruby
Pokémon Stadium 2
Pole Position
Politics of Japan
Pom Poko
Ponzu
Porco Rosso
Pornography in Japan
Port Island
Porunga
Post-Occupation Japan
Posthumous name
Potsdam Conference
Potsdam Declaration
Poupée Girl
Power Stone

Pr
Prefecture
Prefectures of Japan
Pretty Sammy
Prime Minister of Japan
Prince Asaka (Yasuhiko)
Prince Higashikuni Naruhiko
Prince Hisaaki
Prince Koreyasu
Prince Morikuni
Prince Morinaga
Prince Munetaka
Prince Narinaga
Prince Nashimoto (Morimasa)
Prince Nashimoto Moriosa
The Prince of Tennis
Princess Peach
Prince Shōtoku
Princess Mononoke
Princess Tutu
Princess Zelda
Production I.G
Program (The Animatrix)
Project A-ko
Project Sugita Genpaku
Provinces of Japan
Provincial temple

Pu
Puni Puni Poemy
Pure Land Buddhism
PURPLE
Puyi
Puyo Puyo

P